In atomic physics, the magnetic quantum number ( or ) is one of the four quantum numbers (the other three being the principal, azimuthal, and spin) which describe the unique quantum state of an electron. The magnetic quantum number distinguishes the orbitals available within a subshell, and is used to calculate the azimuthal component of the orientation of orbital in space. Thus the s, p, d, and f subshells contain 1, 3, 5, and 7 orbitals each, with values of  within the ranges 0, ±1, ±2, ±3 respectively. Each of these orbitals can accommodate up to two electrons (with opposite spins), forming the basis of the periodic table.

Derivation

There is a set of quantum numbers associated with the energy states of the atom. The Schrödinger equation for the wavefunction of an atom with one electron is a separable partial differential equation. (This is not the case for the neutral helium atom or other atoms with mutually interacting electrons, which require more sophisticated methods for solution)  This means that the wavefunction as expressed in spherical coordinates can be broken down into the product of three functions of the radius, colatitude (or polar) angle, and azimuth:

The differential equation for  can be solved in the form . These integers are the magnetic quantum numbers.

As a component of angular momentum 

The axis used for the polar coordinates in this analysis is chosen arbitrarily. The quantum number  refers to the projection of the angular momentum in this arbitrarily-chosen direction, conventionally called the -direction or quantization axis. , the magnitude of the angular momentum in the -direction, is given by the formula:

.

This is a component of the atomic electron's total orbital angular momentum , whose magnitude is related to the azimuthal quantum number of its subshell  by the equation:

,

where  is the reduced Planck constant. It is not possible to measure the angular momentum of the electron along all three axes simultaneously. These properties were first demonstrated in the Stern–Gerlach experiment, by Otto Stern and Walther Gerlach.

The energy of any wave is its frequency multiplied by Planck's constant. The wave displays particle-like packets of energy called quanta.  The formula for the quantum number of each quantum state uses Planck's reduced constant, which only allows particular or discrete or quantized energy levels.

Effect in magnetic fields 
The quantum number  refers, loosely, to the direction of the  angular momentum vector. The magnetic quantum number determines the energy shift of an atomic orbital due to an external magnetic field (the Zeeman effect) — hence the name magnetic quantum number. However, the actual magnetic dipole moment of an electron in an atomic orbital arises not only from the electron angular momentum but also from the electron spin, expressed in the spin quantum number.

Since each electron has a magnetic moment in a magnetic field, it will be subject to a torque which tends to make the vector  parallel to the field, a phenomenon known as Larmor precession.

Notes

See also
 Quantum number
 Azimuthal quantum number
 Principal quantum number
 Spin quantum number
 Total angular momentum quantum number
 Electron shell
 Basic quantum mechanics
 Bohr atom
 Schrödinger equation

References

Atomic physics
Rotational symmetry
Quantum numbers